Angelo Pasolini (4 October 1905 – 19 February 1959) was an Italian professional football player.

He played for 5 seasons (149 games, 2 goals) in the Serie A for Brescia Calcio and A.S. Roma.

1905 births
Year of death missing
Italian footballers
Serie A players
Brescia Calcio players
A.S. Roma players
Pisa S.C. players
Association football defenders